Zhang Hongwei may refer to:

 Zhang Hongwei (paralympian)
 Zhang Hongwei (pole vaulter)